The Kyrgyz Football Union (KFU; , Kyrgyz futbolduk sojuzu, Kyrgyzskiy futbol'nyy soyuz) is the governing body of football in Kyrgyzstan. The organization controls the Kyrgyzstan national football team, Kyrgyzstan national futsal team and sponsors the Kyrgyz Professional Football League.

Competitions controlled by the Federation
 Kyrgyz Premier League
 Kyrgyzstan League Second Level
 Kyrgyzstan Cup
 Kyrgyzstan Super Cup
 Kyrgyzstan Futsal League
 Kyrgyzstan Women's Championship

Staff List

References

External links
  Official website
 Kyrgyzstan at the FIFA website.
 Kyrgyzstan at AFC site

Football in Kyrgyzstan
Kyrgyzstan
Sports organizations established in 1992
1992 establishments in Kyrgyzstan